"Angel" is a song by British pop duo Eurythmics from their seventh studio album, We Too Are One (1989). It was written by band members Annie Lennox and David A. Stewart and produced by Stewart and Jimmy Iovine. The song was released as the album's fourth UK single in May 1990, and would be the duo's final single for almost a decade (discounting the re-release of two older singles the following year). It was also released as the second single from the album in the United States.

Lennox said in an interview at the time that the song was inspired by the death of her aunt, as she sings about a woman who has killed herself and now has "gone to meet her maker". The music video, directed by Sophie Muller, features the duo taking part in a seance and running through a burning house, and was not widely seen in the US (not shown at all on MTV) supposedly due to several scenes depicting the occult.

"Angel" peaked at number 23 on the UK Singles Chart, though failed to chart on the US Billboard Hot 100.

Lennox re-recorded the song in 1997 for the Diana, Princess of Wales: Tribute album.

Track listings
CD single
 "Angel" (Album Version) – 5:13
 "Missionary Man" (Acoustic) – 3:45
 "Angel" (Choir Version) – 5:48

7-inch single
A. "Angel" (Album Version) – 5:13
B. "Angel" (Choir Version) – 5:48

12-inch single
A. "Angel" (Album Version) – 5:13
B1. "Missionary Man" (Acoustic) – 3:45
B2. "Angel" (Choir Version) – 5:48

Charts

References

1989 songs
1990 singles
Eurythmics songs
Music videos directed by Sophie Muller
RCA Records singles
Song recordings produced by Dave Stewart (musician and producer)
Song recordings produced by Jimmy Iovine
Songs written by Annie Lennox
Songs written by David A. Stewart